This is a list of people who have served as Custos Rotulorum of Middlesex.

 Sir Roger Cholmley bef. 1544 – aft. 1547
 Edward Hastings, Baron Hastings of Loughborough bef. 1558 – 1571
 Richard Goderick bef. 1562 – bef. 1564
 Sir Thomas Wroth bef. 1564–1573
 Sir Gilbert Gerard 1573–1593
 Sir John Fortescue c. 1594–1607
 Sir Thomas Lake c. 1608–1619
 Sir Thomas Edmondes 1619–1639
 Sir Henry Vane 1639–1642
 Sir Peter Wyche 1642–1643
 Sir Edward Nicholas 1643–1646
 Interregnum
 Sir Edward Nicholas 1660–1669
 William Craven, 1st Earl of Craven 1669–1689
 John Holles, 4th Earl of Clare 1689–1692
 William Russell, 1st Duke of Bedford 1692–1700
Lord Edward Russell 1700–1701
 Wriothesley Russell, 2nd Duke of Bedford 1701–1711
 John Sheffield, 1st Duke of Buckingham and Normanby 1711–1714
 Thomas Pelham-Holles, 1st Duke of Newcastle 1714–1762
 Hugh Percy, 1st Duke of Northumberland 1762–1786
 vacant
 Henry Dundas 1793–1794
 William Bentinck, Marquess of Titchfield 1794–1802
For later custodes rotulorum, see Lord Lieutenant of Middlesex.

References
Institute of Historical Research - Custodes Rotulorum 1544-1646
Institute of Historical Research - Custodes Rotulorum 1660-1828

Middlesex